Chenāri or Chanāri is a census town and corresponding community development block in Rohtas district of Bihar, India. As of 2011, the town of Chenari had a population of 6,569, while Chenari block had a population of 131,528. Major commodities produced in the town of Chenari are chironji, rice, and pulses. The census town of Bhardua is administratively counted as part of Chenari block.

Geography 
Most of Chenari block lies on the Rohtas plateau, a hilly region that forms an eastern flank of the Vindhya Range. In some parts of the block, the terrain is rugged enough to preclude any large-scale irrigation projects. The town of Chenari covers an area of 2.5 square kilometres, while the block as a whole covers an area of 190.5201 square kilometres.

History 
The Shergarh fort, located some 13 km south of Chenari town on a hill overlooking the Durgawati river, was first described in 1813 by Francis Buchanan, who attributed the fort's construction to Sher Shah Suri. More recently, however, P.C. Roy Choudhary has pointed out that the fort is uncharacteristic of Sher Shah's constructions and likely predated his rule. He posits instead that, after capturing nearby Rohtasgarh, Sher Shah repurposed the already-existing fort at Shergarh as a second line of defence, thus giving the fort its current name. The final date of Shergarh's abandonment is unknown.

Chenari was first listed as a census town in 2011.

Demographics 
As of 2011, the town of Chenari has a sex ratio of 929 females for every 1000 males, which is the highest among urban centers in Rohtas district. The ratio is lower in the rural parts of Chenari block, with 919 females for every 1000 males; the overall sex ratio of Chenari block is 920, which is about average for Rohtas district. The sex ratio was more equal among 0-6 year olds as of 2011, with 932 girls for every 1000 boys, which was again average in Rohtas. Members of scheduled castes made up 26.82% of the total population of Chenari block (27.42% in rural and 20.71% in urban areas), while members of scheduled tribes constituted 0.83% of the block's population (0.89% in rural and 0.17% in urban areas). The 26.82% scheduled caste membership was highest among all blocks in Rohtas district in 2011. The overall literacy rate of Chenari block as of 2011 was 70.8%; literacy was higher in urban areas than in rural ones, as well as higher in men than in women (80.41% of men but only 60.34% of women could read and write). Both the overall literacy rate and the gender disparity were roughly average for Rohtas district blocks.

Employment 
A majority of the workforce of Chenari block was employed in agriculture in 2011. 26.60% of the workforce was employed as cultivators who owned or leased their own land, while 49.18% were agricultural labourers who worked someone else's land for wages. 4.20% of workers were engaged in household industries. The remaining 20.02% were classified as other workers. In the town of Chenari itself, however, the majority of workers were engaged in non-agricultural work. Cultivators formed 3.95% of the workforce, agricultural labourers formed 3.08%, household industry workers formed 20.95%, and other workers formed the remaining 72.01%. The proportion of household industry workers in the town of Chenari was the highest among urban centres in Rohtas district, and the proportion of agricultural labourers was the lowest.

Amenities 
Of the 111 inhabited villages in the Chenari block, 51.35% (57 villages) had access to educational facilities in 2011, serving 81.76% of the rural population; both numbers were the lowest among CD blocks in Rohtas district. 7 villages (6.31%) had access to medical facilities, serving 12.63% of the population; both percentages were significantly below the district average. All villages had access to clean drinking water; however, none had access to tap water, with water being supplied instead by well and hand pump. 10 villages had post offices. 54 villages had telephone service, serving 77.93% of the rural population. 52 villages had transport communications (bus, rail, or navigable waterways), and 63 had pucca roads. Seven villages had banks and agricultural credit societies. 79 villages had access to electricity, serving 88.28% of the rural population, which was slightly below the Rohtas district average.

Land use 
In 2011, 66.74 of the district was under cultivation; 76.30% of the cultivated area was irrigated.

Villages 
Apart from the census towns of Chenari and Bhardua, Chenari block contains 111 inhabited villages and 42 uninhabited ones, for a total of 153 villages:

See also 
 Chenari (Vidhan Sabha constituency)

References 

Community development blocks in Bihar